Jason Hart may refer to:
Jason Hart (basketball) (born 1978), American basketball player
Jason Hart (baseball) (born 1977), former American baseball player
Jason Hart, fictional character, appearing as the superhero Protector
Jay Hart (footballer) (born 1990), English footballer